The International Drug Policy Consortium (IDPC) is a global network of over 192 NGOs that promote objective and open debate on drug policy at national, regional and international level.  IDPC supports evidence-based policies that are effective at reducing drug-related harm. The IDPC secretariat has offices in London and Bangkok, with staff and consultants around the world.

Vision and mission 

IDPC's vision is that national and international drug policies are grounded in the principles of human rights and human security, social inclusion, public health, development and civil society engagement.

Its advocacy positions are based on five core policy principles. These principles are that drug policies should:

be developed through an objective assessment of priorities and evidence;
be undertaken in full compliance with international human rights law;
focus on reducing the harmful consequences rather than the scale of drug use and markets;
promote the social inclusion of marginalised groups, and not focus on punitive measures towards them;
be developed and implemented based on open and constructive relationships with civil society.

Members 

IDPC was set up in 2006 following a meeting of NGOs, which identified the need for a global advocacy and communication structure in the area of drug policy. Since then, IDPC has welcomed over 170 members, which include NGOs, academic institutions, think tanks, networks and community organisations engaged in drug policy advocacy – located in every region of the world. IDPC also places a very important emphasis on promoting the voice of most affected groups, including people who use drugs and people engaged in the cultivation of crops destined to the illicit drug market – some of the key NGOs representing these populations are members of the network.

IDPC is now widely recognised as the global network of expert NGOs on drug policy. Every decision and advocacy position of IDPC is taken in full consultation with the membership, and the work plan is designed and implemented in close partnership with the member organisations.

In turn, IDPC offers NGOs a platform to share experience and best practice in the field of drug policy, and facilitates the engagement of the network in policy making processes at national, regional and international level – via the provision of advocacy tools, the sharing of key information on how to engage, the organisation of capacity building workshops, and the facilitation of meetings between national governments with local NGOs.

Activities 

IDPC intervenes at two levels in the decision-making process: It aims to facilitate networking and collaboration between civil society stakeholders and empower civil society members to better engage with and influence policy-making processes. In parallel, the IDPC Secretariat also intervenes directly in policy making processes by strategically providing analysis and expertise to governments, regional bodies and UN agencies to promote effective and more humane drug policy options on behalf of the network.

IDPC's work encompasses: 
 Networking and communications – via a multilingual website, social media (Facebook, Twitter, LinkedIn and Google +) and media engagement
 International advocacy – through direct engagement in policy making processes around drug control at international and United Nations level. IDPC spoke at the UN General Assembly Special Session (UNGASS) on drugs in April 2016 and is frequently involved in meetings of the Commission on Narcotic Drugs.
 Monitoring – IDPC runs a variety of tools which monitor and hold international governance to account: CND Blog provides the only publicly available transcripts from meetings of the Commission on Narcotic Drugs; INCB Watch promotes the transparency and accountability of the International Narcotics Control Board; and the Book of Authorities provides an easily searchable archive of agreed international statements to help inform international drug policy discussions.
 National and regional advocacy – to influence national and regional drug policies, in collaboration with local partners
 Publications – over the years, IDPC has published hundreds of reports, advocacy tools and thematic briefings. Its flagship publication, the IDPC Drug Policy Guide, now on its 3rd edition (2016), is a comprehensive repository of best practice and recommendations on drug policy.

Support. Don't Punish 
Support. Don’t Punish is a global advocacy campaign calling for better drug policies that prioritise public health and human rights, coordinated by IDPC since 2013. The campaign encourages grass-root participation in advocating for better drug policy which culminates in the Support. Don't Punish Day of Action on 26 June each year, the date known as the International Day Against Drug Abuse and Illicit Trafficking.
The campaign is organized worldwide with loval activities such as rallies, video projections, street art, concerts, petitions, sports events and film screenings. As of 2022, the campaign claimed the participation of 281 cities from 91 countries.

The Support. Don't Punish campaign aligns with the following key messages:
 The drug control system is broken and in need of reform
 People who use drugs should no longer be criminalised
 People involved in the drug trade at low levels, especially those involved for reasons of subsistence or coercion, should not face harsh or disproportionate punishments
 The death penalty should never be imposed for drug offences
 Drug policy in the next decade should focus on health and harm reduction
 By 2020, 10% of global resources expended on drug policies should be invested in public health and harm reduction.

References

External links 
 International Drug Policy Consortium official website

Organizations established in 2006
Drug policy organizations